The mixed team normal hill competition of the 2015 Winter Universiade was held at the Sporting Centre FIS Štrbské Pleso on January 30.

The final round were cancelled due to bad weather condition and heavy snowfall

Results

References 

Mixed